Michael Gifkins (1945–2014) was a New Zealand literary agent, short story writer, critic, publisher and editor.

Life and career

Gifkins was born in Wellington, New Zealand in 1945. He attended the University of Auckland where he later taught English literature.

As literary agent, Gifkins represented a number of leading New Zealand writers, including Lloyd Jones and Greg McGee. As Jones' literary agent, Gifkins played a major role in the international success of both the novel and film of Jones' novel Mister Pip.

Gifkins wrote three short-story collections: After the Revolution (1982), Summer Is the Côte d'Azur (1987) and The Amphibians (1989). He also edited and published a number of anthologies, beginning with The Gramophone Room (with C. K. Stead in 1983) and Listener Short Stories 3 (1984).

Gifkins was the Writer-in-Residence at the University of Auckland in 1983, the Katherine Mansfield Memorial Fellow in Menton, France, in 1985, and won the Lilian Ida Smith Award for fiction in 1989. He was a member of the New Zealand Society of Authors (PEN NZ Inc) from 1982 until his death.

Legacy
The Michael Gifkins Prize for an Unpublished Novel has been awarded annually by the New Zealand Society of Authors since 2018. The recipient receives a publishing contract from Text Publishing and an advance in the value of NZ$10,000.

Michael Heywood of Text Publishing said of Gifkins: "[He] was kind, wise and generous. A gifted writer himself, he was a fine agent, and completely committed to the cause of New Zealand literature. He loved his writers. He challenged them, spurred them on, and caught them when they fell".

References

External links 
 Michael Gifkins at the New Zealand Electronic Text Collection archive
 Michael Gifkins, profile at the Arts Foundation of New Zealand website
 Michael Gifkins Prize at the Text Publishing website

1945 births
2014 deaths
New Zealand male short story writers
Literary agents
20th-century New Zealand short story writers
New Zealand editors
University of Auckland alumni